WJMT (730 AM, "Bluejay 96.3") is a radio station broadcasting an oldies format. Licensed to Merrill, Wisconsin, United States, the station serves the Wausau-Stevens Point area.  The station is owned by Steven Resnick, through licensee Sunrise Broadcasting LLC.

References

External links

JMT
Radio stations established in 1965
1965 establishments in Wisconsin
Oldies radio stations in the United States